Lü Hsueh-feng (born 8 May 1964) is a Taiwanese actress.  In 2015, she won the Golden Horse Award for Best Supporting Actress for her performance in the film Thanatos, Drunk.

Early life
Lü Hsueh-feng was born into a family of songs and operas. Her parents were singers and actresses. Therefore, she was born and walked through the troupe. She was singing at the stage when she was 3 years old, and she was acting at the age of 5, from the early wild stage play, combined with the "sliding sweep" of the drug sales group. (referring to the Taiwanese opera that was performed on the ground instead of the stage), she went through the performances of the Grand Theatre after the 1980s.

At the age of 16, he participated in Taichung "New Life Music" to learn about Nan Guan Xiao Sheng and Xiao Dan and Harlequin. He then went to the Philippines to perform with the group. At the age of 17, he joined the "Zhu Yufeng" to learn the Taiwanese opera. At the age of 18, he became a youngster. He joined the "Lianxing" and "Yuxing" opera troupe classes in Taichung. In order to improve the performance skills, he used to study other operas such as Peking Opera and Hakka Opera. Xiaosheng, Tongsheng and Harlequin.

Selected filmography
When Love Comes (2010)
The Golden Child (2012)
Thanatos, Drunk (2015)
Never Ending Road (2017)
Synapses (2019)
The Soul (2021)

Awards and nominations

Chinese Film Media Awards

Golden Horse Awards

Taipei Film Awards

References

External links 
 

1964 births
Living people
20th-century Taiwanese actresses
21st-century Taiwanese actresses
Taiwanese film actresses
Taiwanese television actresses
Taiwanese opera actresses
Male impersonators in Taiwanese opera
20th-century Taiwanese women singers
21st-century Taiwanese women singers